Over the past two centuries, the relationship between Native American people and Mormonism has included friendly ties, displacement, battles, slavery, education placement programs, and official and unofficial discrimination. Native American people (also called American Indians) were historically considered a special group by adherents of the Latter Day Saint movement (Mormons) since they were believed to be the descendants of the Lamanite people described in The Book of Mormon. Today there are many Native American members of Mormon denominations as well as many people who are critical of Mormonism and its teachings and actions around Native American people.

History

Under Joseph Smith 
The founder of Mormonism, Joseph Smith, was fascinated by Native Americans from an early age. Scholars Lori Taylor and Peter Manseau believe religious teachings of then deceased Handsome Lake relayed through his nephew Red Jacket near Smith's town influenced the 16-year-old Smith. Smith later stated that in 1823 a Native American angel visited him and told him about a record that contained an ancient history of Native Americans. Smith said he translated this record from golden plates to The Book of Mormon. The existence of the "red sons of Israel" (i.e. Native American) was used as evidence for the authenticity of this account.

Adherents saw Native Americans as part of God's chosen people and they believed that preaching to them was part of the gathering of Israel which will precede the millennium. The church's long history with Native Americans is tied to their beliefs about The Book of Mormon. According to sociologist Marcie Goodman, historically Latter Day Saints held paternalistic beliefs about Native Americans needing help. Outreach to Native Americans became the first mission of Smith's newly organized Church of Christ, as the purpose of The Book of Mormon was to recover the lost remnant of the ancient children of Israel (e.g. Native Americans). Smith sent prominent members Oliver Cowdery, Parley Pratt, Peter Whitmer, Jr., and Ziba Peterson to a "Lamanite Mission" only six months after organizing the church. Though they did not have any converts and reception was lukewarm among the Seneca, Wyandot, and Shawnee people, they were well received by the Delaware people because The Book of Mormon advocated for a divine destiny for Native Americans and a divine right to their territory in the American "promised land".

During the 1840s, Smith sent missionaries to the Sioux (Dakota), Potawatomi (Bodéwadmi), Stockbridge (Mahican) people in Wisconsin and Canada. Additionally, representatives from the Sauk (Asakiwaki) and Fox (Meskwaki) people met with Smith at the Latter Day Saint headquarters in Nauvoo, Illinois. Smith was quoted in a Nauvoo Council of Fifty meeting as stating "If the Lamanites won’t hearken to our council, they shall be oppressed & killed until they will do it." Counselor Orson Spencer stated subsequently that "The gospel to [Native Americans] is, they have been killed and scattered in consequence of their rejecting the everlasting Priesthood, and if they will return to the Priesthood and hearken to council, they shall have council enough, that shall save both them and us." Later, Potawatomi leaders asked the Mormons to join them in an alliance with some other tribes, but Smith declined. The governor of Iowa John Chambers was wary of these meetings which were reported to him by interpreter Hitchcock, as Chambers believed Smith was "an exceedingly vain and vindictive fellow" who might use an alliance with Potowatomi people to start a conflict to seek revenge against Missouri.

Under Brigham Young 

After Smith's death and six months of a succession crisis, Brigham Young became leader of the majority of Smith's followers and the largest denomination in the Latter Day Saint movement, The Church of Jesus Christ of Latter-day Saints (LDS Church). Young discussed an alliance with some Native American nations with other top leaders but these efforts were abandoned in 1846 as Young's followers were preparing to migrate west. According to former Church Historian Marlin Jensen in the Great Basin where the saints were to settle there were already about 20,000 Native Americans including the Shoshone, Goshute, Ute, Paiute, and Navajo. The settlers had some peaceful relations, but because resources were scarce in the desert hostilities broke out. As more immigrants arrived and took over the land, and resources Native Americans had used for thousands of years diminished they felt they had to resist for their survival. By 1860 the population of Mormon migrants in Utah had grown to 40,000 and within another ten years that number had doubled to 86,000. By 1890 Native Americans made up only 1.6% of Utah's population. Over a century later in 2010 that number had remained about the same at 1.3%. Within 50 years of Mormon settlement the population of Utah's Native Americans had gone from 20,000 to under 2,700, a large decline of 86%. Under Young violence broke out between Native Americans and the settlers, though Young stated, "towards so degraded and ignorant a race of people, it was manifestly more economical and less expensive, to feed and clothe, than fight them."

Young taught that cursed racial lineages were in a three-tiered classification of redemption with Lamanites (Native Americans) on top, Jewish people in the middle, and Cain's descendants (Black people) on the bottom. This corresponded to the time when they would each receive the gospel with Native Americans in the foreseeable future, Jewish people would receive it after they were gathered at Jesus Christ's Second Coming, and Black people would receive it in the afterlife during the resurrection. Young sent Jacob Hamblin as a leader for several missionary efforts among Great Basin Native Americans with an important Hopi conversion of Chief Tuba resulting from these efforts.

In the 1890s, James Mooney of the Smithsonian Institution of the Bureau of American Ethnology, and Missouri military commander Nelson Miles, placed some blame on Mormons for the events that precipitated the Wounded Knee Massacre. Some later scholars perpetuated these ideas, however, historical evidence does not support them.

Though, nearly killed by US soldiers in the 1863 Bear River Massacre, Chief Sagwitch became a notable ally of Young and church member by 1873. 100 of his people were also baptized into the LDS Church, and they settled and farmed in Washakie, Utah. They also contributed large amounts of labor towards the building of the Logan Utah Temple in the 1870s and 80s. Sagwitch's grandson Moroni became the first Native American bishop in the LDS Church.

20th Century 
During the century between 1835 and 1947 the official LDS hymnbook had lyrics discussing Native Americans which included the following statements: "And so our race has dwindled/ To idle Indian hearts ... And all your captive brothers/ From every clime shall come/ And quit their savage customs", "Great spirit listen to the Red Man's wail! ... Not many moons shall pass away before/ the curse of darkness from your skins shall flee". In 1975 George P. Lee became the first Native American LDS general authority, though he was excommunicated in 1989, and later pleaded guilty in 1994 to having groped a young girl. By 1977 the LDS Church stated that there were almost 45,000 Native American members in the US and Canada (a number larger than any other Christian denomination except the Roman Catholic Church).

21st Century 

No evidence of the large civilizations or battles described in The Book of Mormon have been found by anthropologists and archaeologists, and DNA studies of Native Americans show that they came from Asia during the latest ice age, and not from the Middle East. Beginning in 1945 then apostle Spencer Kimball was assigned to be over church relations with Native Americans, and he would go on to become president of the church and was very influential in church actions and teachings around Native Americans for four decades until his death in 1985. The LDS Church altered statements after 2007 to say that Lamanites are "among the ancestors" rather than the "principal ancestors" of Native Americans. Church manuals state that Christopher Columbus was inspired by God to sail to the Americas, and The Book of Mormon teaches that because the Lamanites sinned against God, they lost their lands and became "scattered and smitten". LDS-raised and ethnically native Alaskan Sarah Newcomb stated that this framing excuses the genocide of Native Americans during the post-Columbus European colonization of the Americas.

Native American enslavement 

The LDS Church's stance towards slavery alternated several times in its history, from one of neutrality, to anti-slavery, to pro-slavery. Smith had at times advocated both for and against slavery, eventually coming to take an anti-slavery stance later in his life. According to historian Andres Resendez, one of Smith's successors Brigham Young and other LDS leaders in Utah Territory leaders "did not so much want to do away with Indian slavery as to use it for their own ends." Young officially legalized Native American slavery in the Utah Territory in 1852 with each purchased Native American person allowed to be held up to twenty years in indentured servitude. Children between seven and sixteen years old were supposed to be sent to school three months of the year, but were otherwise put to work. Soon after Mormons colonized the Salt Lake Valley in 1847 child slaves became a vital source of their labor, and were exchanged as gifts. Within a decade of settling the Salt Lake Valley over 400 Native American children were purchased and lived in Mormon homes. In 1849 a posse of around 100 LDS men in southern Utah chased and killed twenty-five Native American men in retaliation for some cattle raids, and their women and children were taken as slaves.

Leader Brigham Young advocated buying children held by Native Americans and Mexican traders as slaves, and encouraged Latter-day Saints to educate and acculturate the children as if they were their own. However, despite the requirement to educate the Native American indentured servants, the majority had received no formal education according to an 1860 census. Young's spouse owned a Native American slave Kahpeputz. At age seven she was kidnapped from her Bannock family and tortured, and later purchased by Brigham Young's brother-in-law and gifted to one of Young's wives and renamed Sally. She was a servant in the Young household for over a decade working long hours with the rest of the servants and was not taught to read or write.

While considering appropriations for Utah Territory, Representative Justin Smith Morrill criticized the LDS Church for its laws on Indian slavery. He said that the laws were unconcerned about the way the Indian slaves were captured, noting that the only requirement was that the Indian be possessed by a white person through purchase or otherwise.  He said that Utah was the only American government to enslave Indians, and said that state-sanctioned slavery "is a dreg placed at the bottom of the cup by Utah alone". The Republicans' abhorrence of slavery in Utah delayed Utah's entrance as a state into the Union. In 1857, Representative Justin Smith Morrill estimated that there were 400 Indian slaves in Utah. Richard Kitchen has identified at least 400 Indian slaves taken into Mormon homes, but estimates even more went unrecorded because of the high mortality rate of Indian slaves. Many of them tried to escape. Slavery in Utah ended in 1862 when the United States Congress abolished it nationwide. In a 2020 general conference address church apostle Quentin Cook said of early church history, "Many [non-Mormon] Missourians considered Native Americans a relentless enemy and wanted them removed from the land. In addition, many of the Missouri settlers were slave owners and felt threatened by those who were opposed to slavery. In contrast, our doctrine respected the Native Americans, and our desire was to teach them the gospel of Jesus Christ. With respect to slavery, our scriptures had made it clear that no man should be in bondage to another."

Violence 
Violence between Mormon adherents and Native Americans include the Battle Creek massacre, Salt Creek Canyon massacre, Fountain Green massacre, Bear River Massacre, Battle at Fort Utah, Black Hawk War, Ute Wars, Wakara's (Walker's) War, and Posey War. During the 1850 escalation to the Battle at Fort Utah, Brigham Young ordered his Deseret Territorial Militia to "go and kill" the Timpanogos people of Utah Valley, further stating, "We have no peace until the men [are] killed off—never treat the Indian as your equal". He clarified that the militia should "let the women and children live if they behave themselves." Following this order was the "bloodiest week of Indian killing in Utah history." By the end of the wintertime conflict over 100 Timpanogos Utes were killed by Young's forces, and 50 of their bodies were beheaded and their heads put on display for several weeks in Fort Utah as a warning to the 26 surviving Native American women and children prisoners from the conflict held there. The prisoners were then distributed to LDS families to be used as slaves.

Mountain Meadows Massacre
In 1857 LDS militiamen dressed up as Native Americans and recruited a smaller party of Southern Paiutes for a five-day siege on a wagon train of white pioneers travelling from Arkansas to California through Utah. The disguises were an attempt to shift blame for the aggression from white Mormon people onto the local Native Americans, and for many years after, the mass murder which became known as the Mountain Meadows Massacre was blamed on Paiute Indians. During the militia's first assault on the wagon train, the emigrants fought back, and a five-day siege ensued. Eventually, fear spread among the militia's leaders that some emigrants had caught sight of the white men, likely discerning the actual identity of a majority of the attackers. As a result, militia commander William H. Dame ordered his forces to kill all the adults. 120 men and women, and all their children over the age of seven were slaughtered and their bodies left unburied. The massacre almost pushed the US government into the Utah War with the LDS Church.

Indian Placement Program 

The Indian Placement Program (also called the Indian Student Placement Program and the Lamanite Placement Program) was operated by the LDS Church in the United States, officially operating from 1954 and virtually closed by 1996. It had its peak during the 1960s and 1970s. Native American students who were baptized members of the LDS Church were placed in foster homes of LDS members during the school year. They attended majority-white public schools, rather than the Indian boarding schools or local schools on the reservations. This was in line with the Indian Relocation Act of 1956. An LDS author wrote in 1979 that in southeast Idaho Native Americans from reservations were often treated with disdain by LDS and non-LDS white people.

The program was developed according to LDS theology, whereby conversion and assimilation to Mormonism could help Native Americans. An estimated 50,000 Native American children went through the program. The foster placement was intended to help develop leadership among Native Americans and assimilate them into majority-American culture. The cost of care was borne by the foster parents, and financially stable families were selected by the church. Most of these placements took place on the Navajo Nation, with a peak participation of 5,000 students in 1972. The program decreased in size after the 1970s, due to criticism, changing mores among Native Americans, and restriction of the program to high school students as schools improved on reservations. In the 70s and 80s more Native Americans attended the church's Brigham Young University than any other major US institution of higher learning. Many of the students and families praised the program; others criticized it and the LDS Church for assimilationist policies weakening the Native Americans' ties to their own cultures.

In the spring of 2015, four plaintiffs (now referred to as the "Doe Defendants") filed suit in the Window Rock District of the Navajo Nation Tribal Court, alleging they had been sexually abused for years while in the foster program, roughly from the years 1965 to 1983, and the LDS Church did not adequately protect them. The LDS church filed suit in federal district court in Salt Lake City, alleging that the Tribal Court did not have jurisdiction and seeking an injunction "to stay the proceedings from moving forward under tribal jurisdiction." Federal district court judge Robert Shelby denied the church's motion to dismiss and also ruled that it first had to "exhaust all remedies" in Tribal Court.

Teachings on Native American skin color 

Several church leaders have stated that The Book of Mormon teaches that Native Americans have dark skin (or the "curse of redness") because their ancestors (the Lamanites) were cursed by God, but if Native Americans follow church teachings, their dark skin will be removed. Not far into the narrative of The Book of Mormon God marks Lamanites (the presumed ancestors of Native Americans) with dark skin because of their iniquity, an act similar to the Bible's Curse of Cain which later Christians interpreted as the beginning of the black race. The Book of Mormon passage states, "[God] had caused the cursing to come upon [the Lamanites] ... because of their iniquity ... wherefore, as they were white, and exceeding fair and delightsome, that they might not be enticing unto my people [the Nephites] the Lord God did cause a skin of blackness to come upon them." During the century between 1835 and 1947 the official LDS hymnbook had lyrics discussing a lightening of Native American skin color stating, "Great spirit listen to the Red Man's wail! ... Not many moons shall pass away before/ the curse of darkness from your skins shall flee". They taught that in the afterlife's highest degree of heaven Native American's skin would become "white in eternity" like everyone else. They often equated whiteness with righteousness, and taught that originally God made his children white in his own image. A 1959 report by the U.S. Commission on Civil Rights found that most Utah Mormons believed "by righteous living, the dark-skinned races may again become 'white and delightsome'." Conversely, the church also taught that white apostates would have their skins darkened when they abandoned the faith.

In 1953, President of the Quorum of the Twelve Apostles Joseph Fielding Smith stated, "After the people again forgot the Lord ... the dark skin returned. When the Lamanites fully repent and sincerely receive the gospel, the Lord has promised to remove the dark skin.... Perhaps there are some Lamanites today who are losing the dark pigment. Many of the members of the Church among the Catawba Indians of the South could readily pass as of the white race; also in other parts of the South." Additionally, in a 1960 LDS Church General Conference, apostle Spencer Kimball suggested that the skin of Latter-day Saint Native American was gradually turning lighter. Mormons believed that through intermarriage, the skin color of Native Americans could be restored to a "white and delightsome" state. Navajo general authority George Lee stated that he had seen some Native American members of the church upset over these teachings and that they did not want their skin color changed as they liked being brown, and so he generally avoided discussing the topic. Lee interpreted the teachings to mean everyone's skin would be changed to a dazzling white in the celestial kingdom. Kimball, however, suggested that the skin lightening was a result of the care, feeding, and education given to Native American children in the home placement program.

In 1981, church leaders changed a scriptural verse about Lamanites in The Book of Mormon from stating "they shall be a white and delightsome people" to stating "a pure and delightsome people". Thirty-five years later in 2016, the LDS Church made changes to its online version of The Book of Mormon in which phrases on the Lamanite's "skin of blackness" and them being a "dark, loathsome, and filthy" people were altered. In 2020 controversy over the topic was ignited again when the LDS church's recently printed manuals stated that the dark skin was a sign of the curse and the Lord placed the dark skin upon the Lamanites to keep the Nephites from having children with them. In recent decades, the LDS Church has condemned racism and increased its proselytization efforts and outreach in Native American communities, but it still faces accusations of perpetuating implicit racism by not acknowledging or apologizing for its prior discriminatory practices and beliefs.

Marriages between Native Americans and white Latter Day Saints 

In the past, LDS Church leaders have consistently opposed marriages between members of different ethnicities, but today, interracial marriage is no longer considered a sin. Early Mormon leaders made an exception to the interracial marriage teachings by allowing white LDS men to marry Native American women because Native Americans were viewed as being descended from the Israelites; however, under Young, leaders did not sanction white LDS women marrying Native American men. In 1890 Native Americans made up only 1.6% of Utah's population.  In the 1930s many states had laws banning Native Americans from marrying white people, though, Utah did not.

On July 17, 1831, Smith said that he received a revelation in which God wanted several early elders of the church to eventually marry Native American women in a polygamous relationship so that their posterity may become "white, delightsome, and just". Though Smith's successor Young believed that Native American peoples were "degraded", and "fallen in every respect, in habits, custom, flesh, spirit, blood, desire", he also allowed Mormon men to marry Native American women as part of a process that would make their people white and delightsome and restore them to their "pristine beauty" within a few generations,

Many church leaders had different views on these unions, however, and they were rare, and those in these marriages were looked down upon by many LDS community members. Native American men were prohibited from marrying white women in Mormon communities. Though, he would later oppose the marriage of Native American men to white LDS women, Young performed the first recorded sealing ceremony between a "Lamanite" and a white member in October 1845 when an Oneida man Lewis Dana and Mary Gont were sealed in the Nauvoo Temple. Though few in number, another notable example of a Native American man marrying an LDS woman at the time was Ute violinist David Lemmon marrying Josephine Neilson in the St. George temple in 1890. More common, however, was the experience of Tony Tillohash in the early 1900s who was rejected by the parents of a white LDS woman he proposed to, and was told to marry among his people.

There is evidence that Young may have married his Bannock servant Kahpeputz (Sally) Young (who later married Ute chief Kanosh). Kanosh and Kahpeputz were later both buried in their LDS temple robes as is custom for LDS adherents.

By 1870 only about 30 Mormon men had Native American wives, and few further interracial marriages with Native Americans occurred. Later Mormons believed that Native American skins would be lightened through some other method. Under the presidency of Spencer W. Kimball, the church began discouraging interracial marriages with Native Americans. In 2013, the LDS Church disavowed previous teachings which stated that interracial marriage is a sin.

Other Latter Day Saint groups' teachings 
In 1920 the Reorganized Church of Jesus Christ of Latter Day Saints (now called Community of Christ) published a pamphlet titled Whence Came the Red Man which summarized The Book of Mormon stating, "two great camps ... began to quarrel bitterly among themselves. Part of them became the color of fine copper and the red brethren fought against the white."

See also 
 Black people and Mormonism
 Mormonism and Pacific Islanders

References 

Mormonism and Native Americans
Mormonism and race
History of the Church of Jesus Christ of Latter-day Saints
Brigham Young
Criticism of Mormonism
Indigenous peoples in the United States